Mervue United A.F.C. is an Irish association football club based in Mervue, Galway. Their senior men's team currently plays in the Galway & District League. The club has previously fielded teams in the Connacht Senior League, the League of Ireland U21 Division, the A Championship and the League of Ireland First Division.

History

Early years
Mervue United was formed in 1960 by a group of residents in the McDonagh Avenue area of Mervue, Galway. In 1964–65 the club won its first trophy, the Murphy Cup, a competition for under–13 boys teams. By the early 1970s Mervue United were playing in the Galway & District League and in 1972–73 they won promotion to the league's Premier division. They subsequently began to regularly win the league's two league cups, the Joe Ryan Cup and the Lillis Cup. In 1976–77 they also won a Galway & District League and Michael Byrne Cup double. By 1980 the Mervue United B team had also gained promotion to the Premier Division. However Galway Football Association rules insisted that two teams from the same club could not play in the same division. As a result, Mervue Celtic was founded as a separate club and, like United, they also found success in the Joe Ryan Cup and the Lillis Cup competitions. In 1981–82 they also won the Galway area FAI Junior Cup competition.

Connacht Senior League
Between 1981 and 2000 Mervue United played in the Connacht Senior League. In 1981–82, together with Sligo Rovers Reserves, Castlerea Celtic, Salthill Devon, Ballina Rovers, Tuam Celtic and UCG, Mervue United became founder members of the CSL. In its first season Mervue United finished as runners-up behind Sligo Rovers. They also won a league cup double, winning both the Connacht Senior League Cup and the Connacht Senior League Challenge Cup. Mervue United won the league for the first time in 1982–83 and subsequently went on to become one of the league's most successful teams, winning the title eight times. In 1982–83 and 1983–84 they completed two successive trebles winning the league title, the Challenge Cup and the Connacht Senior Cup. In 1992–93 they went one better and won a quartet of trophies, winning the league title, the Connacht Senior League Shield, Connacht Senior Cup and the Challenge Cup. Between 1996 and 1997 and 1999–2000 Mervue United were also Connacht Senior League champions four times in a row. In 1999–2000 Mervue United completed another treble by also winning the League Cup and the Challenge Cup. In 1984–85 Mervue United first came to national prominence when they became the first CSL club to take part in the FAI Cup, losing 2–1 in the first round to the holders, UCD. In the 1986–87 FAI Cup they defeated Longford Town 1–0 in the first round but got knocked out by Rockmount in the next round. In 1997–98 Mervue United made a third appearance in the FAI Cup but were knocked out in the first round after a replay by Sligo Rovers. As Connacht Senior League champions, United were also invited to play in the League of Ireland Cup.

National leagues 
In 2008, together with local rivals, Salthill Devon, Mervue United were founder members of the A Championship. As the highest placed non-reserve team in the league's inaugural season, Mervue United qualified for a relegation/promotion play-off. They subsequently defeated Kildare County 5–3 on aggregate and were promoted to the League of Ireland First Division. Between 2009 and 2013 Mervue United played in the League of Ireland First Division. In their final season they finished third before losing a relegation/promotion play-off against Longford Town.

Galway United
In 2012 an FAI commissioned report recommended that Galway city and County Galway should be represented in the League of Ireland by a single club or team based at Eamonn Deacy Park. The O'Connor Report also recommended that the Galway Football Association, the Galway United Supporters Trust, Salthill Devon and Mervue United should work together to form such a club. Following the conclusion of the 2013 season, both Mervue United and Salthill Devon withdrew from the League of Ireland First Division to make way for a reformed Galway United. The new board of Galway United featured two Mervue United representatives, Donnie Farragher and Declan McDonnell. The O'Connor Report had also recommended reforming the Connacht Senior League, allowing Mervue United and Salthill Devon to play at a provincial level.
However, in June 2013 the Connacht Tribune reported that the plans for a reformed CSL were shelved due to a lack of sufficient interest from the clubs. The senior teams of Mervue United and Salthill Devon subsequently joined the Galway & District League.

Ground
Mervue United originally operated out of the Redemptorist Grounds before moving to Monivea Road were they shared facilities with Mervue Athletic Club. After joining the Connacht Senior League, the club secured a lease on a clubhouse and a pitch in Fahy's Field. This has remained the club's principal home ground ever since. During the 2009 and 2010 seasons when they were playing in the League of Ireland First Division, Mervue played at Terryland Park as Fahy's Field did not meet League of Ireland standards. The move away from their Mervue fan base affected attendances to the degree that they were the lowest in league records. In early 2011 Fahy's Field was upgraded with fencing and turnstiles been added, allowing Mervue United to play their later League of Ireland games there.

Notable former players
Republic of Ireland international
  Aaron Connolly
  Greg Cunningham
  Ryan Manning

Republic of Ireland U21 internationals
  Séamus Conneely
  Conor Shaughnessy
  Joe Shaughnessy

Republic of Ireland Schools U15 internationals
  Rola Olusola
  Isabelle Fitzpatrick
  Jessica Talbot

Republic of Ireland Women's U16 internationals
  Eve Dossen
  Rola Olusola
  Skye Corcoran
  Isabelle Fitzpatrick

Republic of Ireland Women's U17 internationals
  Eve Dossen

Top Goalscorers
  Patrick Hoban: 21 (2009–12)
  Rory Gaffney: 15 (2009–11)
  Lar Defly: 69

New Zealand U20 international
  Darren Young

Honours
Connacht Senior League
Winners: 1982–83, 1983–84, 1986–87, 1992–93, 1996–97, 1997–98, 1998–99, 1999–2000: 8
Runners-up: 1981–82, 1984–85: 2
Connacht Senior Cup
Winners: 1982–83, 1983–84, 1992–93, 1994–95, 1997–98, 1999–2000: 6
Runners-up: 1986–87, 1987–88, 1988–89, 1998–99, 2007–08: 5
Connacht Senior League Challenge Cup
Winners: 1981–82, 1982–83, 1983–84, 1984–85, 1988–89, 1992–93: 6
Runners-up: 1985–86: 1
Connacht Senior League Cup/Shield
Winners: 1981–82, 1992–93, 1999–2000: 3
Connacht Junior Cup
Winners: 1989–90, 1990–91, 1997–98, 2001–02, 2004–05, 2014–15: 6
Runners-up: 1979–80, 1984–85: 2
Galway & District League
Winners: 1976–77, 1986–87, 1988–89, 1989–90, 2001–02, 2002–03, 2003–04, 2004–05, 2010–11, 2011–12, 2012–13: 11
Michael Byrne Cup
Winners: 1976–77, 1977–78, 2001–02, 2002–03, 2003–04, 2004–05, 2005–06, 2009–10, 2010–11: 9
Runners-up: 2006–07, 2012–13: 2

References

 
Association football clubs in County Galway
Galway & District League teams
Connacht Senior League (association football) clubs
A Championship teams
Former League of Ireland First Division clubs
Former League of Ireland clubs
Association football clubs established in 1960
1960 establishments in Ireland
Galway United F.C.
Association football clubs in Galway (city)